Gowd-e Zereshk (also Romanized as Gowd Zereshk; also known as Gowdzereshk-e Rāmjerd) is a village in Majdabad Rural District, in the Central District of Marvdasht County, Fars Province, Iran. At the 2006 census, its population was 371, in 86 families.

References 

Populated places in Marvdasht County